The 2014 ICC Under-19 Cricket World Cup was a one-day cricket competition for sixteen international U-19 cricketing teams which was played in the United Arab Emirates. This was the tenth edition of the tournament. Sixteen nations competed: the ten Test-playing teams, the United Arab Emirates as hosts, and five additional associate and affiliate qualifiers (Afghanistan, Canada, Namibia, Papua New Guinea, and Scotland). India entered the tournament as defending champions, having won the title in 2012 in Australia under the captaincy of Unmukt Chand.
In the final, South Africa beat Pakistan by six wickets to win the tournament. South Africa captain Aiden Markram was awarded Man of the Series.

Qualification

Sixteen teams participated in the competition: the 10 nations with ICC Full Membership automatically qualified for the tournament, the UAE qualified as the hosts, and five additional teams qualified through the different regional tournaments. Unlike the previous tournament, there was no global qualifier for this world cup: rather, the winner of each of five regional tournaments directly qualified for the World Cup.

Venues
The following venues were used for the tournament:

Groups
The following groups were chosen for the World Cup 2012 by the International Cricket Council. The tournament began with a league stage consisting of four groups of four. Each team played each of the other teams in its group once.

Group A
 
 
 
 

Group B

 
 
 

Group C
 
 
 
 

Group D

Squads

Each country selected a 15-man squad for the tournament.

Fixtures
The tournament groups and fixtures were released on 14 December 2013.

Warm-up games

Group stage

 The top 2 teams from each group qualified for the knock-out rounds of the tournament.
 The bottom 2 teams from each group took part in the Plate competition knock-out.

Group A

Group B

Group C

Group D

Knockout stages

Plate championship

9th place play-off quarter-finals

9th place play-off semi-finals

13th place play-off semi-finals

15th place play-off

13th place play-off

11th place play-off

9th place play-off

Super league

Quarter-finals

Semi-finals

5th place play-off semi-finals

7th place play-off

5th place play-off

3rd place play-off

Final

Final standings

  Qualified for the next world cup as full members of ICC.

  Top associate team.

See also

 ICC Under-19 Cricket World Cup
 International Cricket Council

References

External links
 Official website
 Tournament site on ESPNcricinfo

 
ICC Under-19 Cricket World Cup
International cricket competitions in the United Arab Emirates
Sports competitions in Dubai
2014 in cricket
ICC